HE 1256-2738 is a subdwarf located approximately 1,000 light years away in the constellation Hydra, with a surface temperature of approximately . Along with stars HE 2359-2844 and LS IV-14 116, HE 1256-2738 forms a new group of star called heavy metal subdwarfs.

References

B-type subdwarfs
Hydra (constellation)